Attaphon Kannoo (born 25 August 1991) is a Thai professional footballer who plays as a forward for Thai League 3 club Kasem Bundit University.

Personal life
Sittichok's younger brother Sittichok Kannoo is also a footballer.

References

External links
 

1991 births
Living people
Attaphon Kannoo
Association football forwards
Attaphon Kannoo
Attaphon Kannoo
Attaphon Kannoo
Attaphon Kannoo
Attaphon Kannoo
Attaphon Kannoo